The Midland Counties Championships  was a grass court tennis tournament held at  Edgbaston Cricket and Lawn Tennis Club, Edgbaston, Great Britain from 1882 to 1977.

History
The tournament was established in 1882 at the Edgbaston Cricket and Lawn Tennis Club, Edgbaston near Birmingham, England and ran for seventy three editions until 1977. The event featured both men's and women's singles, doubles and mixed doubles competitions  and was classified as an open tournament.

Champions
Notes: Challenge round: The final round of a tournament, in which the winner of a single-elimination phase faces the previous year's champion, who plays only that one match. The challenge round was used in the early history of tennis (from 1877 through 1921)  in some tournaments not all.

Men's singles
Included:

References

Sources
"Abolition of Challenge Rounds". paperspast.natlib.govt.nz. EVENING POST, VOLUME CIII, ISSUE 65, 20 MARCH 1922. 
 Cole, Matt. (2012) "At The Heart of the Game: The History of Edgbaston Priory Club" (PDF). edgbastonpriory.com. Edgbaston Priory Club. 
 Myers, A. Wallis (1903). "Edgabston". Lawn Tennis at Home and Abroad. New York, USA: Scribner's sons.
 Nieuwland, Alex (2017). "Tournament – Midland Counties Championships". www.tennisarchives.com. Friesland, Netherlands: Tennis Archives.

Further reading
 Ayre's Lawn Tennis Almanack And Tournament Guide, 1908 to 1938, A. Wallis Myers. 
 British Lawn Tennis and Squash Magazine, 1948 to 1967, British Lawn Tennis Ltd, UK.
 Dunlop Lawn Tennis Almanack And Tournament Guide, G. P. Hughes, 1939 to 1958, Dunlop Sports Co. Ltd, UK
 Lawn tennis and Badminton Magazine, 1906 to 1973,  UK.
 Lowe's Lawn Tennis Annuals and Compendia, Lowe, Sir F. Gordon, Eyre & Spottiswoode
 Spalding's Lawn Tennis Annuals from 1885 to 1922, American Sports Pub. Co, USA.
 The World of Tennis Annuals, Barrett John, 1970 to 2001.

External links
http://www.tennisarchives.com/tournament/midland counties championships

Grass court tennis tournaments
Defunct tennis tournaments in the United Kingdom
Tennis tournaments in England